The Star Road is a collection of science fiction stories by American writer Gordon R. Dickson.  It was first published by Doubleday in 1973.  The stories originally appeared in the magazines Amazing Stories, Astounding, Analog Science Fiction and Fact, Galaxy Science Fiction, Worlds of Tomorrow and Fantasy and Science Fiction.

Contents

 "Whatever Gods There Be"
 "Hilifter"
 "Building on the Line"
 "The Christmas Present"
 "Three-Part Puzzle"
 "On Messenger Mountain"
 "The Catch"
 "Jackal’s Meal"
 "The Mousetrap"

Reception
Theodore Sturgeon declared The Star Road to be "nine fine stories [from] one of the better, solid, reliable storytellers around."

References

Sources

1973 short story collections
Short story collections by Gordon R. Dickson
Doubleday (publisher) books